Armond J. "Arnie" Ball (born November 12, 1944) is a retired American volleyball coach best known for his 35 seasons as head coach of the men's volleyball team at Indiana University – Purdue University Fort Wayne (IPFW), now known as the Purdue Fort Wayne Mastodons. He ended his career in 2015 with a total of 570 wins as coach of the IPFW men, and also won 230 games as head coach of the IPFW women's team in the 1980s.

When not on the court actively coaching a competition, Ball operates Team Pineapple, a volleyball clinic that also features his son, Olympic gold medalist Lloy Ball.

Coach Ball and his wife, Sandy, have three children, Lloy, Amy and Jana. They have nine grandchildren, Dyer, Jamison, Caden, Mya, Peyton, Callaway, Alexsandra, Wynn and Kyan.

High school coaching career
Following a successful player career at Ball State, Coach Ball became a high school gym teacher.  One of his first positions was at New Haven High School, a part of the East Allen County Schools system.  In 1973, Ball moved to Paul Harding High School when EACS opened this new high school.  He began his coaching career as Harding's first head baseball coach, and he also founded the school's volleyball program as a non-sanctioned club sport.  He led the Hawks to three Indiana Volleyball Coaches Association Championships.  In 1978, Ball began coaching at the collegiate level when he introduced volleyball to IPFW.  In 1981, Ball made the full-time move to IPFW, taking the helm of both the men's and women's volleyball programs.

IPFW
During Ball's tenure at IPFW, the Mastodons men's team made a significant impact on a sport traditionally dominated by West Coast schools.  His resume includes six trips to the NCAA Final Four, seven MIVA Championships and rosters dotted with All-Conference, All-American and U.S. Olympic team selections.

IPFW's best national finish under Ball came in 2007, as the 'Dons took home a National Runner-Up trophy, falling 3–1 to UC-Irvine in Columbus, Ohio.  For the storied season, Ball was named both the AVCA Division I-II National Coach of the Year and Asics/Volleyball Magazine Coach of the Year.

In addition to the Runner-Up season, Ball has led teams to fourth-place finishes in 1992 and 1994 and third-place finishes in 1991, 1996 and 2006. Fifteen players have been named AVCA All-American, six have been honored as the MIVA Player of the Year and two have gone on to play in the Olympics.

At the helm of the women's team, IPFW captured four Great Lakes Valley Conference (GLVC) championships and earned bids in the NCAA Division II Tournament in 1987 and 1988.  He wrapped his eight-year women's team tenure with an overall record of 231–102 (.693).

Despite the national and international travels that Ball has enjoyed in the sport, his local focus has always remained a stronghold in the Fort Wayne community.  In 2005, Ball was presented with the prestigious Hilliard Gates Achievement Award for his lifetime accomplishments and contributions to the sporting community of Fort Wayne.

Ball's service to IPFW extends beyond the volleyball court sidelines.  Ball served as the school's Athletic Director from 1988 to 1995.

National and international activities
During his coaching career, Ball has enjoyed several appointments to US Volleyball coaching staffs:
 In 1983, Ball served as head coach of the North squad at the National Sports Festival in Colorado Springs, Colo.
 In 1985, Ball served as an assistant coach for the World University Games US men's team in Kobe, Japan
 In 1987, 1993 and 1994, Ball took the helm of squads in the Olympic Festival.  His 1994 team captured a gold in St. Louis.
 In 1988, Ball was the director of the USVBA Junior Elite Camp in Boulder, Colo.
 In 1993, USA Volleyball appointed Ball as the head coach of the U.S. Team in the World University games.  Ball rallied the young team to a 3rd place (bronze) finish after a number of impressive wins, including a five-set victory over France.
 In 2000, Ball had the prestigious honor of serving as a scout for the U.S. National Team, selecting the team for the Olympic Games held in Sydney, Australia.

Notable achievements
 NCAA National Championship Match (2007)
 NCAA Final Four – 3rd place (2006, 1996, 1991)
 NCAA Final Four – 4th place (1994, 1992)

Awards and honors
 Inducted into AVCA Hall of Fame (2012)
 Dick Lugar Health and Fitness Award (2008)
 AVCA Division I-II National Coach of the Year (2007)
 Asics/Volleyball Magazine Coach of the Year (2007)
 Red coat recipient, Mad Anthonys (2007)
 Inducted into Purdue Fort Wayne Athletics Hall of Fame (2006, the inaugural class of the institution then known as the IPFW Athletics Hall of Fame)
 Hillard Gates Achievement Award (2005)

Coaching record

 – Conference member Lewis had all wins vacated for seasons 2001, 2002, and 2003.  The records included above reflect the actual outcome of matches with Lewis for those years.  If the vacated matches were reflected as IPFW wins, then the IPFW conference record for those years would be 10–6, 7–9, and 12–4, respectively.

References

External links
 https://web.archive.org/web/20100410080913/http://www.gomastodons.com/sports/m-volley/mtt/ball_arnie00.html
 http://bulletin.ipfw.edu/content.php?catoid=8&navoid=253
 http://universiade.daegu.go.kr/jpn/games/comm/FOfficialInfo.asp?ad_no=5700704
 https://web.archive.org/web/20100502100216/http://www.gomastodons.com/sports/m-volley/ipfw-m-volley-body.html
 http://www.mivavolleyball.com/information/standings/2000_standings
 http://www.glvcsports.com/index.aspx?tab=volleyball&path=vball

American volleyball coaches
Living people
1944 births
Ball State Cardinals men's volleyball players
Purdue Fort Wayne Mastodons athletic directors
Purdue Fort Wayne Mastodons men's volleyball coaches
Purdue Fort Wayne Mastodons women's volleyball coaches
Place of birth missing (living people)